One Exciting Night is a 1944 British musical comedy film directed by Walter Forde and starring Vera Lynn, Donald Stewart and Mary Clare. The film was also known as You Can't Do Without Love. The screenplay concerns a female singer who becomes involved with a man who is the victim of a kidnap plot.

Plot
Vera Baker is an aspiring singer desperate for an opportunity to impress producer Michael Thorne. Her chance arrives at a benefit concert that is also the scene of an attempted kidnapping of Thorne by gangsters chasing a priceless Rembrandt. Vera somehow eventually thwarts the villains, and along the way manages to wow the audience with her singing.

Cast
 Vera Lynn ...  Vera Baker 
 Donald Stewart ...  Michael Thorne 
 Mary Clare ...  Mrs. Trout 
 Frederick Leister ...  Hampton 
 Phyllis Stanley ...  Lucille 
 Cyril Smith ...  Joe 
 Richard Murdoch ...  Illusionist 
 Mavis Villiers ...  Mabel 
 Peggy Anne ...  Bessie 
 Jeanette Redgrave ...  Ellen

Critical reception
TV Guide called the film a "decent musical farce."

References

External links

1944 films
British musical comedy films
1944 musical comedy films
Films directed by Walter Forde
Columbia Pictures films
British black-and-white films
1940s English-language films
1940s British films